"My Family's Slave" is a non-fiction, biographical short story by the Pulitzer Prize-winning journalist Alex Tizon. It was the cover story of the June 2017 issue of The Atlantic. It was Tizon's final published story and was printed after his death in March 2017. He died on the day that The Atlantics editorial staff decided the article would be featured on the magazine's front cover, before they could tell him of their decision. The story went viral on the Internet and generated extensive debate, receiving both praise and criticism.

Background
The work recounts the life story of a Filipino woman, Eudocia Tomas Pulido, known in the family as "Lola" (grandmother in Tagalog), who lived with the author's family for 64 years, for most of that time essentially as a slave, and who helped raise three generations of the author's family.

Pulido was a distant relation of the Tizon family, from a poorer branch of the clan. In the 1940s, she had been tricked into servitude by the author's grandfather, a military officer during the Commonwealth Era, and then at the age of 18 was "given" to the author's then 12-year-old mother as a personal slave.  Pulido came to the United States in 1964 on a special passport linked to the author's father, who was a diplomat. However, her travel papers expired in 1969, and she was ineligible for the permanent-resident status that the author's family received, making her an illegal immigrant in the U.S for the next two decades. She eventually received amnesty as a result of the Immigration Reform and Control Act of 1986, and she became a U.S. citizen in October 1998.

The Tizon family went through a tumultuous time as they moved from the Philippines to Los Angeles, to Seattle, and finally to Oregon. The author's father quit his consular post, turning into a gambler and womanizer, eventually leaving the family. His mother worked long hours while studying medicine and eventually remarried, with Pulido suffering continuous abuse and neglect from the author's parents, besides receiving no salary or remuneration for her services. Nonetheless, Pulido steadfastly carried out her matriarchal duties, essentially serving as a surrogate mother to the Tizon children. Eventually, the author and his siblings stood up for Pulido to their mother. Once an adult with a family of his own, Alex Tizon brought Pulido, then aged 75, to live in his home, and he paid for her to visit her home village in the Philippines when she was 83. She died on November 7, 2011, at the age of 86 and Tizon later repatriated her ashes to her birthplace of Mayantoc, Tarlac.

Reception
"My Family's Slave", Tizon's story published by The Atlantic, went viral and sparked significant debate in both the United States and the Philippines. The Atlantic acknowledged these mixed reactions to the story. Filipinos generally praised Tizon, while many Western commentators criticized him.

The Filipino magazine Scout argued that 'a lot of the international outrage is coming from a place where they don't fully understand the culture the story is set in'. 

The American magazine Slate also noted the 'wide-sweeping judgment coming from people who have no context nor familiarity with Filipino culture, history, or economics'. 

Slate further wrote that, as the Philippines is a developing country, "the wide disparity between those with and without money makes the culture of servitude a viable option for many born into poverty, especially in the provinces".

The article was lauded as "an honest, haunting tale" by the Chicago Tribune, but it also received criticism. Author Randy Ribay questioned the moral high ground of those who criticized Tizon through mobile devices that were built with the use of child labor, and he added that "asking why [Tizon] wasn't better at doing what was right every step of the way isn't the most fruitful line of discussion. We are all complicit in a number of evils. We all perpetuate oppression throughout our daily lives."

The Washington Post wrote that many Filipinos expressed that "while they don't condone indentured servitude, Pulido's life was a much too common scenario ingrained in Filipino culture and one that must be confronted and openly discussed." The Washington Post further noted that the article "drew wide praise, with readers commending Tizon's honesty, and some saying it was among the most powerful magazine pieces published in recent memory. But it also spurred intense criticism from some readers who felt it humanized a slave owner and others who described Tizon as being 'complicit in the systemic oppression of Filipino househelp'."

References

External links
 "My Family's Slave" at The Atlantic

2017 essays
2017 short stories
American essays
The Atlantic (magazine) articles
Filipino-American culture
Labor in the Philippines
Works about slavery